A topspinner is a type of delivery bowled by a cricketer bowling either wrist spin or finger spin.

Topspinner may also refer to:

 Top-spinner (traditional activity), one who spins a toy on its axis
 Topspinner (racquet sports), a shot in racquet sports that increases a player's consistency

See also

 Topspin (disambiguation)